Daisaku (written: 大作) is a masculine Japanese given name. Notable people with the name include:

, Japanese politician
, Japanese Buddhist philosopher, educator, writer and nuclear disarmament advocate
, Japanese politician
, Japanese film director and cinematographer
, Japanese actor and voice actor
, Japanese rower

Japanese masculine given names